Francesca Scognamillo (born 17 March 1982) is an Italian sailor. She competed in the Yngling event at the 2008 Summer Olympics.

References

External links
 

1982 births
Living people
Italian female sailors (sport)
Olympic sailors of Italy
Sailors at the 2008 Summer Olympics – Yngling
Sportspeople from Livorno